BerliOS (short for "Berlin Open Source") is a project founded by the Fraunhofer Institute for Open Communication Systems (FOKUS), Berlin, to coordinate the different interest groups in the field of open source software (OSS) and to assume a neutral coordinator function. The target groups of BerliOS were developers and users of open source software on the one side and OSS-related companies on the other.  its website was still accessible, though hosting no projects.

Overview 
BerliOS consisted of several subprojects:
 DocsWell, a database for open source related documentation
 SourceWell, a news service for open source projects
 SourceLines, a "best practice" database for successful open source projects
 SourceBiz, a list of open source companies
 DevCounter, a database of open source developer profiles
 OpenFacts, a wiki-based open source knowledge database (using the MediaWiki software)
 SourceAgency (beta), a platform for coordinating open source funding

Closure 
The operators of the BerliOS project announced that BerliOS would close at the end of 2011 due to lack of sufficient funding and support. As the news of the pending closure spread, BerliOS received numerous rescue proposals. As a result, it was later announced that BerliOS would continue as a non-profit institute run by a combination of volunteers, donations and corporate sponsorship.

On February 23, 2012, BerliOS announced on their blog that a cooperation agreement had been signed with SourceForge, which meant that all projects hosted on BerliOS' systems would be automatically mirrored in new and separate projects on SourceForge. On April 4, 2012, SourceForge reiterated this statement on their blog and provided more specifics about the collaboration.

In January 2014 BerliOS announced that they would disable their hosting services on 30 April 2014.

See also 

 Comparison of open source software hosting facilities

References

External links
 BackupTheBerlios on GitHub

Project hosting websites
Discontinued open-source software hosting facilities